
El Océano Lake is a lake in area of Savajes Gentios in Beni Department, Bolivia. Its surface area is 100 km².

References 

Lakes of Beni Department